The Tenderfoot's Money is a 1913 American silent Western film featuring Harry Carey.

Cast
 Harry Carey as The Gambler
 William A. Carroll as The Tenderfoot
 Henry B. Walthall as The Prospector
 Claire McDowell as The Prospector's Wife
 William Beaudine as In Bar
 William J. Butler as In Bar
 John T. Dillon
 Alfred Paget

See also
 Harry Carey filmography

External links
 

1913 films
1913 Western (genre) films
1913 short films
American silent short films
American black-and-white films
Films with screenplays by Stanner E.V. Taylor
Silent American Western (genre) films
Films directed by Anthony O'Sullivan
1910s American films